The Hari Niwas Palace is a palace in Jammu, India. It overlooks the Tawi river on one side and on the other side the Trikuta hills.

History 
The palace was built for Sir Hari Singh, the last reigning Maharaja of Jammu and Kashmir (1895 - 1961), in the early 20th century, as a separate extension of 'Amar Mahal' (built in 1890) so he could entertain his guests after 1925, rather than at the older Mubarak Mandi Palace. Here he spent the last days of his stay in Jammu & Kashmir, before moving to Bombay (now Mumbai). The building is an art-deco structure. The descendants of the Maharaja converted the palace into a heritage hotel in 1990. In the  same compound "Amar Mahal Museum and Library" displays the 120 kg gold throne of Sir Hari Singh.

References

External links
 Hari Niwas Palace, website

Royal residences in India
Tourist attractions in Jammu (city)
Palaces in Jammu and Kashmir
Jammu and Kashmir (princely state)
Buildings and structures in Jammu (city)
Heritage hotels in India
Rajput architecture
19th-century establishments in Jammu and Kashmir